Alexander David Lloyd George is a Welsh physician and television personality who serves as the UK Youth Mental Health Ambassador within the Department for Education.

Life and career
George grew up in Nantgaredig, a village near Carmarthen, Wales. He is the oldest of three children. George studied medicine at the Peninsula College of Medicine and Dentistry and graduated in 2015. He went on to work in Emergency Medicine at University Hospital Lewisham in London. In 2020, George announced that he would switch to train to become a general practitioner.

In 2018, George appeared in the fourth series of the ITV2 reality dating series Love Island. Following the show, he returned to working part-time at Lewisham whilst also making regular media appearances speaking about mental health on ITV morning shows including Good Morning Britain, Lorraine and Loose Women.

In 2019, George launched his podcast The Waiting Room with Dr Alex in which he interviews other healthcare professionals about topical health and wellbeing issues. Guests have included David Nott.

In July 2020, George's youngest brother Llŷr died of suicide. In January 2021, George launched a campaign requesting the UK Government prioritise mental health amongst children and adolescents, especially in light of the COVID-19 pandemic. During Children's Mental Health Week in February 2021, George met with Prime Minister Boris Johnson, who appointed George to the newly created position of Youth Mental Health Ambassador. In addition, George also became a member of the Mental Health in Education Action Group. They will discuss the best way for children to return to education after the COVID-19 pandemic and ensure they receive the support they need.

At his post as Youth Mental Health Ambassador, George will work to improve the support that young people receive regarding their mental health, as well as aid in the shaping and creation of policies to increase the support for students within the education system. George holds a large social media following, which he will use to demonstrate the support currently available whilst working to bring about changes.

In 2021, he joined OnlyFans to post "videos around mental health, self-care and positivity".

In 2022, he purchased four holiday homes in Pembrokeshire to market as holiday lets. After further consideration he decided to use one of the holiday homes to host a Ukrainian family. After posting this on social media he received criticism, with people saying that he was "tone deaf" for buying the holiday homes amid a shortage of affordable houses for local people in Wales. Because of a crisis in second homes in holiday areas in Wales the Welsh language is under threat and communities are being "pushed out" of where they grew up.

George later responded, saying that he was planning to rent one of the holiday homes to locals, after the Ukrainian family would not need it anymore. He also said that he would be willing to meet local campaigners on the second homes issue.

Notes

References

21st-century Welsh medical doctors
Celebrity doctors
Living people
People from Carmarthen
Love Island (2015 TV series) contestants
1991 births